The Magazine of Art was an illustrated monthly British journal devoted to the visual arts, published from May 1878 to July 1904 in London and New York City by Cassell, Petter, Galpin & Co. It included reviews of exhibitions, articles about artists and all branches of the visual arts, as well as some poetry, and was lavishly illustrated by leading wood-engravers of the period such as William Biscombe Gardner.

History

Its origins can be traced back to May 1851, when the House of Cassell started publication of a journal devoted to The Great Exhibition of that year. It evolved, in 1852, into The Illustrated Exhibitor and Magazine of Art, a weekly devoted to the arts, educational in purpose and offering "culture for the little cultured". It changed name in February 1853 to The Illustrated Magazine of Art but never achieved great popularity and ceased publication in 1854. The magazine was revived for a while during the 1862 International Exhibition but then lay dormant until 1878.

The Magazine of Art itself started publication on 25 April 1878, the same year as the Exposition Universelle in Paris, and was edited initially by Arthur J. R. Trendell until 1880. Editorship then passed in turn to Eric Robertson (1880–81), William Ernest Henley (1881–86), Sidney Galpin (1886) and Marion Harry Spielmann (1886–1904), who also edited The Pall Mall Gazette. Within three years of starting publication, the magazine had become firmly established and now included art reviews. Artist Hubert Herkomer was persuaded to design a poster for the magazine which depicted the goddess of art on the steps of a temple with the great masters of art looking on in approval (see image above).

No expense was spared in producing the journal which was regarded as the "flag of the house". It sought to engage the interest of the art lover and art collector while retaining an independent critical voice. One of its most popular contributors was artist William W. Fenn who by then had lost his sight. Despite his blindness, he was able to contribute reviews with the help of his wife who took him around the galleries and gave him verbal information about the exhibits.

W. E. Henley (1881–86) was responsible for revitalising the magazine and transforming it into a "lively cosmopolitan review of the arts" that was influential in shaping the public's perception of and taste in art. He engaged eminent artists and literary figures to write for the journal including R. L. Stevenson, Richard Jefferies, J. Comyns Carr and others, and the quality of the wood engravings was further improved. He also introduced poetry to its pages.

M. H. Spielmann was editor for 17 years from 1886 to 1904 and encouraged many well known artists, as well as leading art critic John Ruskin, to contribute articles. In 1888, a supplement was introduced called Royal Academy Pictures, which, as its name suggests, contained reproductions of the chief works from the annual Royal Academy exhibitions in London. However, The Magazine of Art failed to make sufficient returns to justify its continued existence and publication ceased in 1904, though Royal Academy Pictures continued until 1916.

References

Further reading

The following volumes are available to read online and download:
The Magazine of Art Gift Book Illustrated, Comprising Volumes I & II, Magazine of Art (no dates listed).
The Magazine of Art Volume 5 (Nov 1881-Oct 1882).
The Magazine of Art Volume 6 (Nov 1882-Oct 1883).
The Magazine of Art Volume 7 (Nov 1883-Oct 1884).
The Magazine of Art Volume 8 (Nov 1884-Oct 1885).
The Magazine of Art Volume 9 (Nov 1885-Oct 1886).
The Magazine of Art Volume 10 (Nov 1886-Oct 187).
The Magazine of Art Volume 11 (Nov 1887-Oct 1888).
The Magazine of Art Volume 12 (Nov 1888-Oct 1889).
         The Magazine of Art Volume 13 (Nov 1889-Oct 1890).
         The Magazine of Art Volume 15 (Nov 1891-Oct 1892).
The Magazine of Art Volume 16 (Nov 1892-Oct 1893).
The Magazine of Art Volume 17 (Nov 1893-Oct 1894).
The Magazine of Art Volume 20 (Nov 1896-Apr 1897).
The Magazine of Art Volume 21.1 (May 1897).
The Magazine of Art Volume 21.2 (Jun 1897).
The Magazine of Art Volume 22 (Nov 1897-Oct 1898).
The Magazine of Art Volume 23.6 (Apr 1899).
The Magazine of Art Volume 23.7 (May 1899).
The Magazine of Art Volume 23.8 (May 1899).
The Magazine of Art Volume 23.10 (Jun 1899).

External links

Illustrations of Queen Victoria from The Magazine of Art (Bedfordshire Libraries)

Visual arts magazines published in the United Kingdom
Monthly magazines published in the United Kingdom
Cassell (publisher) books
Defunct magazines published in the United Kingdom
Magazines published in London
Magazines established in 1878
Magazines disestablished in 1904
Victorian culture